D. silvestrii may refer to:
 Deutzia silvestrii, a plant species
 Dongmoa silvestrii, a harvestman species found in Tonking
 Dongmolla silvestrii, a harvestman species

See also
 Silvestrii (disambiguation)